Curtis Alan Buzzard is a United States Army major general who serves as the commanding general of the United States Army Maneuver Center of Excellence and Fort Benning since July 14, 2022. Prior to that, he served as the deputy chief of staff for operations, plans and training of the United States Army Forces Command from January 2022 to June 2022, and as the 78th Commandant of Cadets of the United States Military Academy from June 2019 to May 2021.

Education
Buzzard earned a Bachelor of Science degree in economics from the United States Military Academy at West Point. He later received a Master of Public Administration degree from the Harvard Kennedy School and a master's degree in military science from the Marine Corps University.

Military career
Buzzard graduated from the U.S. Military Academy in 1992 and was commissioned as a second lieutenant in the 82nd Airborne Division as a rifle platoon leader. He went on to serve in numerous command roles as company leader within several different units, including the 1st Battalion, 504th Parachute Infantry Regiment, 2nd Squadron, 11th Armored Cavalry Regiment and later in the 3rd Infantry Regiment.

Buzzard later attended the Marine Corps University and returned to the 82nd Airborne Division as a battalion operations officer and battalion executive officer. He later served as commander of the 1st Battalion, 505th Infantry Regiment. Buzzard then served as the US Army War College Fellow at the Center for Strategic and International Studies and returned to the 82nd Airborne Division, where he served as the division G3 and later commanded the division's 3rd Brigade Combat Team. Buzzard also served as the army military aide to the president, serving presidents George W. Bush and Barack Obama.

Buzzard served tours in both Iraq and Afghanistan.

On June 28, 2019 Colonel Buzzard was appointed Commandant of the United States Corps of Cadets at West Point. On October 4, 2019, Buzzard was promoted to brigadier general.

In March 2021, it was announced that Buzzard would become deputy chief of staff for operations for NATO's Operation Resolute Support, which trains and assists Afghan Security Forces; deputy commanding general for operations for U.S. Forces-Afghanistan (USFOR-A); and commander of U.S. National Support Element Command-Afghanistan for Operation Freedom's Sentinel (part of Resolute Support).

After the 2021 US withdrawal from Afghanistan, Buzzard will lead the Defense Security Cooperation Management Office Afghanistan in Qatar. He will administer funding and over-the-horizon aircraft maintenance support for the Afghan National Defense and Security Forces, also supporting the newly-formed US Forces Afghanistan Forward, in charge of American troops in Afghanistan. He assumed command in late July.

In July 2021, Buzzard was nominated for promotion to major general. He was reassigned as commanding general of the U.S. Army Maneuver Center of Excellence in March 2022, and assumed command on July 14, 2022.

Personal life
Buzzard is married and is a father of three daughters.

Awards and decorations
Defense Superior Service Medal
Legion of Merit (3 awards)
Bronze Star Medal (3 awards)
Meritorious Service Medal (6 awards)
Army Commendation Medal (3 awards)
Air Assault Badge
Army Staff Badge
Combat Infantryman's Badge
Expert Infantryman's Badge
Master Parachutist Badge
Presidential Service Badge
Ranger Tab
Numerous foreign jump wings

References

Year of birth missing (living people)
Living people
United States Military Academy alumni
Military personnel from Pennsylvania
United States Army Rangers
Harvard Kennedy School alumni
Marine Corps University alumni
United States Army personnel of the Iraq War
United States Army personnel of the War in Afghanistan (2001–2021)
United States Military Academy people
Recipients of the Legion of Merit
United States Army generals
Recipients of the Defense Superior Service Medal